John Lawrence Stackpool (September 6, 1917 – August 20, 1976) was an American football fullback who played in the National Football League (NFL) for the Philadelphia Eagles in 1942. After playing college football for Washington, he was drafted by the Eagles in the 10th round (83rd overall) of the 1942 NFL Draft. He served in World War II for the United States Navy after the 1942 NFL season.

References

External links
 

1917 births
1976 deaths
Players of American football from Chicago
American football fullbacks
Washington Huskies football players
Philadelphia Eagles players
United States Navy personnel of World War II